The Floorball European Championships were floorball European Championships organized by the International Floorball Federation (IFF). They were held twice in 1994 and 1995 for men and once for women (1995).

Men

Results

References

European Championships at floorball.org

International floorball competitions
Floorball in Europe
European championships